Major-General William Stewart Codrington Wright  is a senior British Army officer.

Military career
Wright was commissioned into the Light Infantry on 5 August 1989. After commanding the 2nd Battalion, The Rifles, he became commander of 1st Armoured Infantry Brigade in August 2014. He went on to become Assistant Commandant of the Royal Military Academy Sandhurst in September 2016 and Director of Army Staff in August 2019. After that he became Military Secretary and General Officer, Scotland, in September 2021.

He was appointed a Member of the Order of the British Empire (MBE) in the 2009 New Year Honours, advanced to Officer of the Order of the British Empire (OBE) in the 2013 Birthday Honours and advanced to Commander of the Order of the British Empire (CBE) in the 2020 Birthday Honours.

References

 

|-
 

British Army major generals
Living people
Commanders of the Order of the British Empire
Year of birth missing (living people)
The Rifles officers
21st-century British Army personnel
20th-century British Army personnel
The Light Infantry officers